The 2005 Idea Prokom Open was the eighth edition of this men's tennis tournament and was played on outdoor clay courts. The tournament was part of the International Series of the 2005 ATP Tour. It took place in Sopot, Poland from 1 August through 7 August 2005. Unseeded Gaël Monfils won the singles title.

Finals

Singles

 Gaël Monfils defeated  Florian Mayer, 7–6(8–6), 4–6, 7–5
 It was the first singles title of Monfils' career.

Doubles

 Mariusz Fyrstenberg /  Marcin Matkowski defeated  Lucas Arnold Ker /  Sebastián Prieto, 7–6(9–7), 6–4
 It was the first title of the year and the third of their career for both Fyrstenberg and Matkowski.

References

External links
 ITF tournament edition details

Idea Prokom Open
Orange